FXS may refer to:

 Fluctuation X-ray scattering, scientific technique
 Foreign exchange station, telephone terminology
 Fragile X syndrome, genetic disorder
 Toyota FXS, concept vehicle
 FXS station callsign
 KFXS radio station
 WFXS TV station

See also 

 
 
 FX (disambiguation)